Boris Smirnov (1924 – 1979) was a Russian ethnologist and historian, excavator of Kelginino Gravefield in Eastern Mokshaland. He collected a great bulk of field material on Moksha Ancient History, including folklore, toponimy, historical, and archeological data connected to Moxel culture, traditions and Medieval trade routes.

Ethnological findings 

Among the findings of Boris Smirnov there is a Medieval star chart used in Mokshaland by travellers, wanderers, herders and navigators on Volga trade route. He had been collecting epic tales and legends and then checking the places they narrated about. He had been accumulating information on feasts and everyday life, agriculture and honey hunting. He recorded law and traditional punishment details, old crafts peculiarities and old children games rules. The rest of his time he spent in the city library reading all the scientific journals they received. He led correspondence with scholars who sometimes kept answering him, sometimes were reluctant to keep the discussion going in spite of the fact he sometimes proposed plausible solutions. The neighbours new that he might be bound three places: post office, where he received tons of books, library or forest if he had a short handle spade with him. He used to wear cheap suits and a cap in summer and fufaika wool jackets, and a soldier's fur hat in winter time. He roamed about Big Moksha Forest and often ran across Dubravlag border lines. Since it was a special territory and trespassing was forbidden he from time to time been detained and questioned but happily always been released after phone calls and enquiries sent to Zubova Polyana. Except for ethnology and archeological artefacts he was a botanist and collected full herbarium of Zubovo-Polyansky Aimak. He had a small garden and grew Manchurian walnut (Juglans mandshurica) in it, as well as he always had lots of perfect vegetables and various flowers. "He had been treated with compassion by his friends Valerian Ryabov, Adolf Prokhorov and some others" writes Sergey Olenin. He didn't bother them much but always gave a short report on his recent work. Boris Smirnov's health condition had been deteriorated in 1966. He was not able to finish his Book 4 and seems he didn't start Book 5 he mentioned in his works. In 1979 he died. Adolf Prokhorov delivered his diaries  and drafts to the Mordvoia Republic Government Institute For Humanities. Most of his field work had remained unpublished in the Institute For Humanities archives for years. First two books were published posthumously in 2012

Ethnographic material
Ethnographic material includes old Moksha rites, traditions, bygone tales, pagan beliefs, mythology, legends and folklore material reflecting life and customs. Major part consists of tales and legends regarding toponimy history: founding of villages, names of rivers, lakes and gorges.

Letters to Kremlin regarding Mordovia renaming
Since Boris Smirnov had learnt Moksha language and discovered many facts of the ancient Mokshaland history that been never taught in schools he was convinced that the term Mordovia was historically incorrect and moreover derogatory or to be precise was an ethnic slur for Mokshas and Erzyas. He applied for the republic renaming to the government with all the evidence he had proving that the term Mordovia does not comply the contemporary situation and republic must have been renamed to Erzya-Moksha. He received an answer that he might be under some misapprehension. He went to Moscow hoping that a personal appointment would solve the misunderstanding. He wrote again and made appointments again. Olenin suggests this was in vain, writing: "He was lucky not to be arrested for his views opposing the Communist Party line, may be because he was treated as not entirely healthy person."

Kelginino Gravefield 
The most striking findings were the Carolingian sword and Vladimir the Great's and his son Novgorodian prince Vysheslav's symbols of power. They date back to 1010. The latter became the proof for declaring the historical unity of Russian and Mordva peoples that can be traced back 1000 years. Later the government stopped supporting the archeological studies.

Critics 

Boris Kevbrin, Vladimir Rogachev, and Dmitry Shulyaev (Books 1, 2, and 4 introduction)

Works 
 Book 1. Middle Partsa and Chiush [rivers]. 1963
 Book 2. Middle Vad and Lundan [rivers]. 1964
 Book 3. Low Vad [river]. 1965
 Book 4.

See also
Gardariki

References

Cited works

General sources

External links

1924 births
1979 deaths
Soviet historians
Russian ethnologists
Volga Finns
Indo-European archaeological sites
Archaeological cultures in Russia
Ancient Russia
People from Mordovia
People without hands
People with schizophrenia